List of dwarfism organizations around the world.

Africa

Uganda 
Little People of Uganda

Asia

Hong Kong 
Little People of Hong Kong 小而同罕有骨骼疾病基金會

Iran 
 Iranian Short Stature Association کوتاه قامتان بلند همت :انجمن کوچولوهای  ایرانی

Iraq 
 Short Stature in Iraq

Australia and Oceania

Australia 
Short Statured People of Australia

New Zealand 
Little People of New Zealand

Europe

Austria 
Union of Short-Statured People and their Families (BKMF-Osterreich)

Bulgaria 
 Little Bulgarian People

Czech Republic 
Association of Little People of Czech Republic

Denmark 
Danish Dwarf Association (DVF)

Finland 
Small Stature Finland (Finnish: Lyhytkasvuiset – Kortväxta ry)

France 
 Association of the Small (APPT)

Germany 
 Federal Association For The Promotion of People of Short Stature (VKM)
German Association for People of Short Stature and Their Families (BKMF)

Ireland 
Little People of Ireland

Italy 
AISAC

Kosovo 
Little People of Kosovo

The Netherlands 
 Netherlands Association for Little People

Norway 
Little people of Norway (NiK)

Poland 
Little People of Poland
Fundacja Rodzic Nie Pęka

Slovakia 
 občianske združenie Palčekovia
palcekovia.sk

Spain 
The National Association for Growth Problems
Fundación ALPE Acondroplasia
Asociación ADEE España (Acondroplasia y otras Displasias Esqueléticas con Enanismo)

Sweden 
The Association for People of Short Stature in Sweden

United Kingdom 
Dwarf Sports Association UK
Little People UK
Restricted Growth Association
Short Stature Scotland

North America

Canada 

Alberta Little People
Little People of British Columbia
Little People of Canada
Little People of Manitoba
Little People of Ontario
Quebec Association of Little People

United States 
Dwarf Athletic Association of America
Little People of America
Little People of the World
Little People Matter (Social justice movement)

South America

Chile 
Little People of Chile

Colombia 
Little Giants Association of Colombia

Worldwide 

Human Growth Foundation
International Dwarf Advocacy Association
Little People of the World Corporation (USA Based)
Little People Matter (Social justice movement)

See also 

Dwarfism
List of people with dwarfism
List of shortest people

References 

Disability rights organizations
Organisations
Human rights-related lists
Lists of organizations